Camps are set up by the United Nations Relief and Works Agency (UNRWA) in Jordan, Lebanon, Syria, the West Bank and the Gaza Strip to accommodate Palestinian refugees registered with UNRWA, who fled or were expelled during the 1948 Palestinian exodus after the 1948 Arab–Israeli War or in the aftermath of the Six-Day War in 1967, and their patrilineal descendants. There are 68 Palestinian refugee camps, 58 official and 10 unofficial, ten of which were established after the Six-Day War while the others were established in 1948 to 1950s.

Whilst only a third of registered Palestinian refugees live within the boundaries of the refugee camps, Palestinian refugees "show extraordinary social and economic integration outside the camps and informal gatherings". Many Palestinian refugees live in adjacent or nearby "gatherings", defined as "the geographic area, outside the official camps, which is home to a minimum 15 Palestinian households."

The total number of registered Palestine refugees has grown from 750,000 in 1950 to around 5 million in 2013.

Definition of Palestinian refugee 

UNRWA's mandate is to provide assistance to Palestinian refugees, including access to its refugee camps. For this purpose, it defines Palestinian refugees as "persons whose normal place of residence was Palestine during the period 1 June 1946 to 15 May 1948, and who lost both home and means of livelihood as a result of the 1948 conflict."

UNRWA also extends assistance to the patrilineal descendants of such refugees, as well as their legally adopted children.

Role of UNRWA
For a camp to be recognized by UNRWA, there must be an agreement between the host government and UNRWA governing use of the camp. UNRWA does not itself run any camps, has no police powers or administrative role, but simply provides services to the camp.  UNRWA recognizes facilities in 58 designated refugee camps in Jordan, Lebanon, Syria, the West Bank and the Gaza Strip, and it also provides facilities in other areas where large numbers of registered Palestine refugees live outside of recognized camps. UNRWA also provided relief to Jewish displaced persons inside Israel following the 1948 conflict until the Israeli government took over responsibility for them in 1952. Refugee camps developed from tented cities to rows of concrete blockhouses to urban ghettos indistinguishable from their surroundings (effectively becoming urban developments within existing cities or by themselves), that house around one third of all registered Palestine refugees.

The funding for UNRWA activities comes almost entirely from voluntary contributions from UN member states. UNRWA also receives some funding from the Regular Budget of the United Nations, which is used mostly for international staffing costs.

List of camps
The camps are divided between five regions:
 Gaza Strip: The Gaza Strip has eight official and no unofficial refugee camps, and 1,221,110 registered refugees.
 West Bank: The West Bank has 19 official and four unofficial refugee camps, and 741,409 registered refugees.
 Syria: Syria has nine official refugee camps and three unofficial refugee camps, and 499,189 registered refugees.
 Lebanon: There are 12 official refugee and no unofficial camps in Lebanon, and 448,599 registered refugees.
 Jordan: There are 10 official and three unofficial refugee camps in Jordan, and 2,034,641 registered refugees.

Population statistics
The evolution of Palestinian refugee population is shown below:

The number of Palestinian refugees living within the UNWRA registered area of operations is shown below, both those living in camps and those living outside camps:

The table below shows the population of registered refugees, other registered people, and refugees residing in camps, in 2018. UNRWA's definition of Other Registered Persons refer to "those who, at the time of original registration did not satisfy all of UNRWA's Palestine refugee criteria, but who were determined to have suffered significant loss and/or hardship for reasons related to the 1948 conflict in Palestine; they also include persons who belong to the families of other registered persons."

Bibliography

References

External links

 Palestinian Refugees in Lebanon
 Palestinian Refugees in Syria
 Palestinian Refugees in Jordan
 As rebuilding begins at Lebanon's nahr al bared, displaced refugees are eager to return, William Wheeler and Don Duncan, World Politics Review, 11 March 2008
 UN refugee agency unveils Palestinian archive

Maps
 Fields of operation, 2014 map by UNRWA
 Camps in Lebanon
 Camps in the Palestinian territories

Forced migration
Statelessness
Temporary populated places